Rutland is a town in Worcester County, Massachusetts, United States.  The population was 9,049 at the 2020 census. Rutland is the geographic center of Massachusetts; a tree, the Central Tree, located on Central Tree Road, marks the general spot.

History
The town was first settled by Europeans in 1666 and was originally called "Naquag," a name which came from Nipmuc. Officially incorporated in 1713, the Town of Rutland was made up of Barre, Hubbardston, Oakham, Princeton, and the northern half of Paxton. In Northern Rutland there are prison camps used during the Revolutionary War used for captured Hessian mercenaries hired by the British.  The town's most famous citizen is Rufus Putnam, who was George Washington's chief engineer in the American Revolutionary War.  He held various town offices in Rutland and served as Representative to the General Court.  Later, he led a group of Revolutionary War veterans west to settle in the Northwest Territory and Putnam became known as the "Father of Ohio."  The Rufus Putnam House still stands, and is now a B&B.  It is depicted on the town seal.

Geography

Rutland is bordered by Princeton on the northeast, Holden on the east, Paxton on the southeast, Oakham on the southwest, and Barre and Hubbardston on the northwest. Rutland has five villages within its limits: New Boston, West Rutland, Muschopauge, North Rutland, and Turkey Hill.

Rutland is the highest town between The Berkshires and the Atlantic. Rutland is the geographical center of Massachusetts.

Demographics

As of the year 2008, there were approximately 8,257 people, 2,300 households, and 1,721 families residing in the town. The racial makeup of the town was 96.58% White, 1.04% Black or African American, 0.14% Native American, 0.46% Asian, 0.44% from other races, and 1.34% from two or more races. Hispanic or Latino of any race were 1.32% of the population.

There were 2,253 households, out of which 42.3% had children under the age of 18 living with them, 64.1% were married couples living together, 8.6% had a female householder with no husband present, and 24.8% were non-families. Of all households 19.9% were made up of individuals, and 6.6% had someone living alone who was 65 years of age or older.  The average household size was 2.77 and the average family size was 3.21.

In the town, the population was spread out, with 30.8% under the age of 18, 6.1% from 18 to 24, 33.8% from 25 to 44, 21.7% from 45 to 64, and 7.7% who were 65 years of age or older.  The median age was 35 years. For every 100 females, there were 102.1 males.  For every 100 females age 18 and over, there were 95.6 males.

The median income for a household in the town was $62,846, and the median income for a family was $70,689. Males had a median income of $45,824 versus $35,390 for females. The per capita income for the town was $23,311.  About 1.5% of families and 3.3% of the population were below the poverty line, including 2.0% of those under age 18 and 7.3% of those age 65 or over.

Politics 

Internally, Rutland uses a town meeting style system of governance. As of 2019, the Board of Selectmen is composed of Lyndon S. Nichols, Jeffrey A. Stillings, Mitchell Ruscitti, Leah M. Whiteman, and Leroy "Skip" Clark. Terms for the board of selectmen are staggered.

Arts and culture
Each year, Rutland holds a four-day-long Fourth of July celebration, beginning on July 1.  Events include performances by area musicians, a lip-sync concert, chicken barbecue hosted by the local Fire Brigade, a Historical Society Lemonade Social, and an acclaimed fireworks show. On the Fourth, Rutland holds a parade with floats made by local organizations and special guests including local and regional politicians.

August also brings in the Central Tree Chowder Chili Challenge, an event hosted and sponsored by the Rutland Fire Brigade.  Area restaurants compete for local bragging rights for having the best area clam chowder.  With two ways to "win", restaurants compete for both the people's choice as well as the votes of their peers and competitors.

While the main draw to the day is the clam chowder, the event has evolved into a family-oriented day.  There is no admission fee except for those who wish to sample the chowder.  However, there are also pony rides, face painting, "exotic" animal exhibits, inflatable rooms for kids, a free "train ride" (a lawn tractor towing three cars around the local athletic track), as well as miscellaneous vendors, both local and from surrounding towns. 
 
Proceeds go to the local Fire Brigade, which uses the money for restoration of the town's original fire station, and also to help supplement the expenses of the Fire Department by purchasing much needed equipment that would otherwise have to wait for town funding.

Education

Rutland is a part of the Wachusett Regional School District.

There are two elementary schools: Naquag Elementary, for grades up to 2nd, and Glenwood Elementary, grades 3rd through 5th.

The middle school is Central Tree Middle School.

The public high schools are Wachusett Regional High School in Holden, and Bay Path Regional Vocational Technical High School in Charlton.

Rutland is also home to the residential treatment facility, Devereux School. Devereux provides educational and psychological services to youth aged 6–21.

Library

The Rutland public library was founded . In fiscal year 2008, the town of Rutland spent 1.16% ($159,360) of its budget on its public library—some $20.17 per person, per year ($26.58 adjusted for inflation to 2022).

See also

Geographic centers of the United States

References

External links

Massachusetts state community page for Rutland

Rutland MA 4th of July
Wachusett Region town page for Rutland
Rutland, MA Historical Society note: domain expired and now owned by an unrelated advertising 
Rutland, MA Crop Hunger Walk

 
Towns in Worcester County, Massachusetts
1666 establishments in Massachusetts